Peter Economy is an American author, editor, and ghostwriter. Although his most-recent books tend to reside in the technology genre—particularly software product development and AWS/cloud—he has written books in a variety of other genres, including leadership, management, memoir, biography, consulting, how-to, entrepreneurship, marketing, sales, and a children’s book. Economy is The Leadership Guy on Inc.com where he has published more than 1,500 articles on a variety of topics related to leadership, management, and other business topics.

Before that, he served as Associate Editor of Leader to Leader magazine for 18 years, working closely with Frances Hesselbein, Editor-in-Chief—at first under the auspices of the Peter F. Drucker Foundation for Nonprofit Management, and finally, the Frances Hesselbein Leadership Forum at Pitt University.

Early life and education

The son of a U.S. Air Force officer, Economy was born at Hamilton Air Force Base in Novato, California. With family moves every four or five years, he spent his early life in Pennsylvania, California, Virginia, and Georgia, graduating from Warner Robins High School in Warner Robins, Georgia, and then Stanford University in Palo Alto, California with majors in Human Biology and Economics. During this time, he played French horn in school bands and the Macon (Georgia) Symphony Band before switching to electric guitar in local garage and rock bands.

Writing
Economy is the author, editor, and ghostwriter of more than 125 books with sales of more than 3 million copies, including a Wall Street Journal bestseller. He has written about leadership and management for Leader to Leader, Gallup Business Journal, Inc.com, and Time (magazine).

He wrote his first book when, in 1989, he was asked by Dr. Bob Nelson, creator of Employee Appreciation Day, to write a book on the topic of negotiation for the publisher Scott Foresman. At the time, Economy was working as Administrative Manager for Horizons Technology, a San Diego-based software development firm. This first book, Negotiating to Win, was published in 1991, and its success eventually led Economy to abandon his management career to focus full time on writing business books and articles.

During his 18 years at Leader to Leader magazine, he worked closely with Frances Hesselbein, Editor-in-Chief, and with numerous business and academic leaders globally, providing editorial support to their articles. These leaders included Kiran Mazumar-Shaw, John Hope Bryant, Rosabeth Moss Kanter, Peter Senge, Juana Bordas, Jean Lipman-Blumen, Marshall Goldsmith, Inés Temple, Jeffrey L. Bowman, Lolly Daskal, Clifton Taulbert, Ron Wallace, and others.

Economy has also written for 1099, the magazine for independent professionals, and workWELL, a publication of Unum Group.

Media

Economy has been featured in national newspapers as an expert in business.

Huffington Post

The Globe and Mail

U-T San Diego

Mundo Ejecutivo

Alto Nivel

Business Matters (magazine)

Nursing Management (journal)

The Virginian-Pilot

CareerBuilder

Post-Tribune

St. Louis Post-Dispatch

IndustryWeek

InfoWorld by International Data Group

Network World by International Data Group

San Jose Mercury News

Alerus Financial

Community initiatives and teaching

Economy is on the National Advisory Council of The Art of Science Learning, a  National Science Foundation funded project that uses the arts to spark creativity in science education. He is also a founding member of the board of Sports for Exceptional Athletes, a nonprofit athletic organization that provides enhanced opportunities for people with and without disabilities.

Economy taught the upper-division course, Creativity and Innovation, at San Diego State University.

Books
 Joel Tosi and Dion Stewart with Peter Economy (2023). 
 Lisa Rojany and Peter Economy (2022). 
 Peter Economy, Eric Tyson, et. al. (2022). 
 Kevin Daum, Janice Brewster, Peter Economy, and Anne Mary Ciminelli (2021). 
 Peter Economy (2021). 
 Peter Economy (2020). 
 Peter Economy, Eric Tyson, et. al. (2019). 
 
 
  
 
 
 
 
 
 
 
 .

References

American editors
Stanford University alumni
Ghostwriters
Living people
American male writers
Year of birth missing (living people)